7 Days is a New Zealand comedy gameshow similar in some ways to the British program Mock the Week, hosted by Jeremy Corbett and created by thedownlowconcept. Paul Ego and Dai Henwood usually appear on each episode, along with other comedians, who form teams and answer questions about stories from the last week.

Show format
At the start of each show, Jeremy Corbett announces a content warning, saying "the following show is for adults only and contains bad language that may offend some people". This is often followed by an opening joke based on an event in the past seven days. On some occasions, the content warning became the joke – including being said in a parody of Downfall (following several Auckland schoolboys saluting the Nazi flag), being missed out completely (while the Prime Minister was out of the country), and being texted while driving (two days before the ban on use of mobile phones while driving came into force). While the show is normally screened at 9:30pm and originally 10pm, the episode on 21 October 2011 was screened at the earlier time of 7:30pm and as a result was a PGR rated show. The opening segment mentioned the show was PGR and then replaced a few swear words with cleaner equivalents such as fudge. The show was moved to the earlier time to coincide with the screening of the Rugby World Cup 2011 Bronze Final.

After the title card, Corbett introduces the leaders of each team, normally Paul Ego for Team 1 and Dai Henwood for Team 2, although one episode featured an all-Australian team replacing Dai Henwood's team. After the leader of each team is introduced, the leader introduces the rest of their team. Regular team members include Ben Hurley, Josh Thomson, Steve Wrigley, Jeremy Elwood, Urzila Carlson, Jesse Griffin, Madeleine Sami, Michèle A'Court and Justine Smith. Special guest comedians appear on some episodes.

There are usually 5-7 games in each show, with "What's the Story" always being the first, and "Caption That" usually being last. After the teams guess the story, Corbett confirms the actual story before adding a joke of his own. In early episodes, Corbett also intervened if the joke made was in bad taste, or he became the butt of the joke, yelling "get out" and making the contestant pretend to leave.

Teams are allocated "points" at the end of the round based on numbers in the news. In earlier episodes, Corbett randomly allocated point to the teams based on their performance. The team winning the most rounds wins the episode, but this is not always the case.

An MVP was awarded in earlier episodes which was later removed. One of the panellists thanks NZ On Air to close the show.

Games

Games played include:

What's the Story?
News footage, usually from 3 News but occasionally from ONE News, with the sound removed is played while team members make humorous comments and then try and work out what the story is about.

Caption That
A caption contest: a news photograph is shown and the teams are required to invent their own (usually humorous) captions for it.

My Kid Could Draw That
A primary school child explains a picture he/she has drawn about a recent news story, and the teams must work out what it is before the kid tells them what it is.

Answers
Teams are given an answer related to a news event in the last 7 days and are required to work out what the question is, in the style of the American quiz Jeopardy!.

History
A video clip of a New Zealand historical event is played, and a person shown in the clip is then brought into the studio together with three look-alikes. The teams are required to guess which one is the person in the video. This is based on a segment in the British pop music quiz Never Mind the Buzzcocks. The segment was once played with when teams had to guess which one of the group of four was a Lawson quintuplet (New Zealand's only living set of quintuplets), not realising that the four people were four of the five quintuplets.

Community News
 A newspaper headline is given, but with missing words, and the teams are required to work out the missing words. This is based on a round from the UK news quiz Have I Got News for You.

Slice of Seven
 A musician comes on to the show and sings a song about a news story and the teams have to try guess the story. The name of the segment references the 1986 Dave Dobbyn single Slice of Heaven.

Yes Minister
A political figure (usually an MP, but mayors are also common) makes an appearance, and the teams ask them closed-ended questions which the guest must answer without saying "yes" or "no" (or saying or gesturing similar). The team who makes the "minister" say 'yes' or 'no' wins. The segment's concept originated in the "Yes-No Interlude" in the game show Take Your Pick, and its name is a reference to the 1980s British sitcom Yes Minister.

Quote Me
A photo of a person and an acronym of a quote that person said during the last 7 days are given to each team, and they must come up with the correct full quote. This is based on a round from Mock the Week.

My Professional Opinion
A video clip is played with people with the same occupation (e.g. butchers, lifeguards etc.), sharing their opinion to a news story from the last 7 days but don't say what the story actually is. The teams must guess what they are talking about. After both teams have guessed another video clip is played with the people telling them "that was my professional opinion, on the (news story)". This game replaced a similar earlier game called Taxi Driver, in which a taxi driver talks about a story from the last seven days.

That's The Spirit
Used on the live show held at the SkyCity Casino in Auckland on 6 April 2011. Each team has to tell the audience about an interesting news story they have noticed in the last 7 days, an image of the article in a newspaper or webpage is shown to the audience. Formerly named Show and Tell.

In my opinion/To be honest/On the bright side/All I want for Christmas (used for the 2010 series finale)
A filler at the end of the show if running early, after the final scores have been added and the winner awarded. Team members form a humorous opinion on news stories of the week.

Guest who?
Introduced in season five, a person involved with a news story from the past week has their head covered with a black cloth, and the teams must ask closed-ended questions and the mystery guest will answer "yes" or "no". The teams will continue to ask yes-or-no questions until one team is able to work out who the guest is.

Yeah Nah
Introduced in season five, this game works very similar to a debate, where the host presents a statement and one team will be the agreeing team and one will be the disagreeing team. The teams will then give reasons as to why they agree or disagree. A winner is picked by the host at the end of the round.

AV Department
Introduced in season five, as a secondary school equivalent of 'My Kid Could Draw That'. A group of secondary school students must produce a short film based on a news story from the past 7 days, and the panellists are required to work out the story from the clip produced.

Like Sex
Introduced in season nine, each team has to describe how a thing is like sex.

Club Topicana
Introduced in season 14 - and similar to Mock the Weeks "Scenes We'd Like to See" segment - it invites the panellists to tell a series of jokes by inhabiting a character in a certain situation dictated by Corbett based on a news story from the week.

Recurring panelists
Although Dai Henwood and Paul Ego are permanent members of each team respectively a number of recurring comedians make up the remaining positions on the panels each night. This group have all been in more than two episodes and includes Ben Hurley, Josh Thomson, Steve Wrigley, Jeremy Elwood, Urzila Carlson, Jesse Grffin, Madeleine Sami, Michele A'Court, Cal Wilson, Claire Hooper, Heath Franklin (as Chopper), James Acaster, Joseph Moore, Jesse Mulligan, Peter Helliar and Jay-Jay Feeney.

Episodes

Season 1 (2009)

Special (2009)

Season 2 (2010)

Season 3 (2011)

Season 4 (2012)

Special (2012)

Season 5 (2013)

Season 6 (2014)

Season 7 (2015)

Season 8 (2016)

Special (2016)

Season 9 (2017)

Season 10 (2018)

Season 11 (2019)

Season 12 (2020)

Season 13 (2021) 
Following the lockdown in Auckland, from episode 12 onwards there is Perspex sheeting between team leader and guest(s), and the studio audience is replaced with virtual.

The coloured backgrounds denote the result of each of the shows:
 – indicates Team 1 won
 – indicates Team 2 won

Season 14 (2022) 
With this season, the show moved to an earlier 7:30pm timeslot, and team leaders (in bold) became rotated week-to-week.

Episodes broadcast in May 2022 averaged over 180,000 viewers, an improvement from below 160,000 viewers for the series premiere in February. Ratings then declined below 170,000, before increasing steadily to over 200,000 viewers for the series finale.

The coloured backgrounds denote the result of each of the shows:
 – indicates Team 1 won
 – indicates Team 2 won

Season 15 (2023) 
Corbett confirmed during the twentieth episode of season 14 that 7 Days would return in 2023.

Specials
Occasionally a special edition of 7 Days screens, breaking out of the shows traditional format. Examples of such specials are:

In addition, there are several "road" episodes where the show has been taken outside the Auckland studio to other centres on New Zealand, including Christchurch (2011 and 2012) and Queenstown (2012). Nearly all of these episodes feature the game 'Yes Minister' with the local mayor or another local figure (the Wizard of New Zealand appeared in the 2012 Christchurch episode) as the "minister".

References

External links

 on NZ On Screen

2009 New Zealand television series debuts
2000s New Zealand television series
2010s New Zealand television series
2020s New Zealand television series
English-language television shows
New Zealand comedy television series
New Zealand game shows
Panel games
Television shows funded by NZ on Air
Three (TV channel) original programming